Essostruthella is a genus of longhorn beetles of the subfamily Lamiinae, containing the following species:

 Essostruthella acatinga Martins & Galileo, 2004
 Essostruthella nevermanni Lane, 1972
 Essostruthella notaticollis (Lane, 1973)

References

Hemilophini